Myriophyllum indicum is a species of water milfoil. It is native to India, where it grows in aquatic habitat such as ponds and streams. It generally grows over a meter long, with its stem lined with whorls of fleshy green leaves divided into many narrow lobes.

References

External links

indicum
Freshwater plants
Flora of India (region)